Lanco (stylized as LANCO, formerly LANco) is an American country music band consisting of Brandon Lancaster (lead vocals), Chandler Baldwin (bass guitar), Jared Hampton (keyboards), Tripp Howell (drums), and Eric Steedly (guitar). The band was signed to Arista Nashville. The band's name is short for Lancaster and Company.

Music career

The band was founded in 2015. After meeting record producer Jay Joyce at a Keith Urban concert, they signed to his publishing company, and then to Arista Nashville. Through the label, they released their debut four-song EP, titled Extended Play on April 15, 2016. They also released their first single from the album, "Long Live Tonight", and another one of their songs, "Greatest Love Story", appears in the Netflix series The Ranch as well as season 22 of ABC's The Bachelor. "Greatest Love Story" reached No. 1 on the Hot Country Songs and Country Airplay charts at the end of 2017.

In December 2017, Sony Nashville announced the band's third single, "Born to Love You". It and "Greatest Love Story" appear on their debut album Hallelujah Nights, which was released in January 2018.

Discography

Albums

Extended plays

Singles

Notes

Music videos

Awards and nominations

References

Arista Nashville artists
Country music groups from Tennessee
Musical groups established in 2013
2013 establishments in Tennessee